The Jean Béliveau Trophy is awarded to the top regular season scorer of the Quebec Major Junior Hockey League. The award is named after Quebec native Jean Béliveau, a member of the Hockey Hall of Fame. Béliveau died on December 2, 2014 at the age of 83.

Wayne Gretzky is in favour of renaming the Conn Smythe Trophy after Jean Béliveau, creating a different trophy with the same name.

Winners

References

External links
 QMJHL official site List of trophy winners.

Quebec Major Junior Hockey League trophies and awards